Air Marshal Hari Chand Dewan,  (20 September 1921 – 22 August 2017) was an Indian Air Force officer. He was awarded the Padma Bhushan in 1972 for his services at the head of the Eastern Air Command in the Indo-Pakistani War of 1971.

Career 
Hari Chand Dewan was born on 20 September 1921. In 1940 he was one of the 24 Indian pilots seconded to the UK. In 1969 he received Param Vishist Seva Medal. He was head of the Eastern Air Command in the Indo-Pakistani War of 1971.

Death
Dewan died in August 2017 at the age of 95.

References

1921 births
2017 deaths
Place of birth missing
Air marshals of the Indo-Pakistani War of 1971
Indian Air Force air marshals
Indian Air Force officers
Indian military personnel of the Indo-Pakistani War of 1971
Indian military personnel of World War II
Non-British Royal Air Force personnel of World War II
Recipients of the Padma Bhushan in civil service
Recipients of the Param Vishisht Seva Medal
Vice Chiefs of Air Staff (India)